The following is a list of notable deaths in May 2019.

Entries for each day are listed alphabetically by surname. A typical entry lists information in the following sequence:
 Name, age, country of citizenship at birth, subsequent country of citizenship (if applicable), reason for notability, cause of death (if known), and reference.

May 2019

1
Issa J. Boullata, 90, Palestinian scholar and writer.
Dinko Dermendzhiev, 77, Bulgarian footballer (Botev Plovdiv, national team), complications from a stroke.
Mary Doakes, 82, American educator.
Maa Afia Konadu, 67, Ghanaian radio presenter.
Kurt Lang, 95, German-born American sociologist, respiratory failure.
Arnor Njøs, 88, Norwegian soil scientist.
Alessandra Panaro, 79, Italian actress (Poveri ma belli, Belle ma povere, Rocco and His Brothers).
Sir Arvi Parbo, 93, Estonian-born Australian mining executive (BHP, WMC Resources, Alcoa).
Beatrix Philipp, 73, German politician, member of the Landtag of North Rhine-Westphalia (1985–1994) and the Bundestag (1994–2013).
B. Subhashan Reddy, 76, Indian judge, Chief Justice of Madras High Court (2001–2004) and Kerala High Court (2004–2005).
Heinz Unbehauen, 83, German control engineer.

2
Roland Aboujaoudé, 88, Lebanese Maronite Catholic hierarch, Auxiliary Bishop of Antioch (1985–2011).
Max Arthur, 80, British military historian and actor (Doctor Who).
Susan Beschta, 67, American punk rock musician and judge, brain cancer.
Mike Boehm, 63, American music critic and arts reporter.
George C. Clerk, 87, Ghanaian botanist and plant pathologist.
Michel Crauste, 84, French rugby union player (Racing, Lourdes, national team).
Fatimih Dávila, 31, Uruguayan model, Miss Uruguay (2006), homicide.
Larry Dick, 64, American football player (Maryland Terrapins, Saskatchewan Roughriders).
Rolf Eckrodt, 76, German automotive engineer and executive, CEO of Mitsubishi Motors (2001–2005).
Telésforo Santiago Enríquez, Mexican journalist, shot.
David Harney, 72, English footballer (Grimsby Town, Scunthorpe United, Wimbledon). (death announced on this date)
Rafael Hernández Colón, 82, Puerto Rican politician, Governor (1973–1977, 1985–1993), leukemia.
Master Hirannaiah, 85, Indian actor (No 73, Shanthi Nivasa, ...Re), liver disease.
Frank Ivancie, 94, American businessman and politician, Mayor of Portland, Oregon (1980–1985).
Lord Toby Jug, 53, British politician.
Red Kelly, 91, Canadian Hall of Fame ice hockey player (Detroit Red Wings, Toronto Maple Leafs) and politician, MP (1962–1965).
Li Xintian, 95, Chinese psychologist.
Micha Lindenstrauss, 81, German-born Israeli judge, State Comptroller (2005–2012).
Duncan MacRae, 85, New Zealand rugby league player (national team).
Reginald Mengi, 75, Tanzanian businessman.
Ali Mroudjaé, 79, Comorian politician, Prime Minister (1982–1984).
Md. Nazim Uddin, 84, Bangladeshi freedom fighter.
Pauline O'Regan, 96, New Zealand educator and writer.
Chris Reccardi, 54, American animator, storyboard artist, cartoon director (The Ren & Stimpy Show, Samurai Jack, The Powerpuff Girls) and musician, heart attack.
Gloria Schiff, 90, American fashion editor and model.
John Starling, 79, American bluegrass musician (The Seldom Scene), Grammy winner (1992), heart failure.
Murray Thomson, 96, Canadian peace activist.
Guido van den Berg, 44, German politician, member of the Landtag of North Rhine-Westphalia (since 2012), cancer.
Juan Vicente Torrealba, 102, Venezuelan harpist and composer.
Warren W. Wiersbe, 89, American biblical scholar and pastor.
Mike Williamson, 90, Australian sports commentator (3AK, 3AW, HSV-7).
David Gordon Wilson, 91, British-born American engineering professor.

3
Richard Brown, 86, American lawyer, Queens County District Attorney (since 1991).
Peter Bucher, 72, German Olympic handball player (1972).
George Economou, 84, American poet.
Bill Gompers, 91, American football player (Buffalo Bills).
Kjell Grandhagen, 64, Norwegian military officer, head of the Norwegian Intelligence Service (2010–2015), multiple myeloma.
Dante Gullo, 71, Argentine sociologist and politician, member of the Chamber of Deputies (2007–2011) and Buenos Aires City Legislature (2011–2015).
George Hanna, 90, Iraqi-American basketball player.
Sir Peter Herbert, 90, British admiral.
Andy Jick, 66, American sports announcer (Boston Celtics, Boston College Eagles).
Chuck Kinder, 76, American novelist, heart failure.
V. Viswanatha Menon, 92, Indian politician.
Mose Se Sengo, 73, Congolese musician.
Goro Shimura, 89, Japanese mathematician (Shimura variety, Taniyama-Shimura conjecture).
Frits Soetekouw, 80, Dutch footballer (Ajax, DWS, national team).
Irene Sutcliffe, 94, British actress (Coronation Street).
Enrico Taglietti, 93, Italian-born Australian architect, recipient of the Australian Institute of Architects Gold Medal (2007).
Greg Younging, 58, Canadian Opaskwayak academic.
Bob Zeman, 82, American football player (Los Angeles/San Diego Chargers) and coach (Oakland Raiders, San Francisco 49ers).

4
Claude Cadart, 91, French sinologist.
Charles Clarke, 95, British military officer.
J. R. Cobb, 75, American musician (Atlanta Rhythm Section, Classics IV), heart attack.
Salvatore Corallo, 90, Italian politician, President of Sicily (1961), Deputy (1976–1979) and Senator (1979–1983).
Rachel Held Evans, 37, American Christian writer, encephalitis after allergic antibiotic reaction.
Terje Moe Gustavsen, 64, Norwegian politician, Minister of Transport and Communications (2000–2001) and Director of the Public Roads Administration (since 2007), lung infection.
Thomas Hynes, 80, American politician and lawyer, complications from Parkinson's disease.
Jumpin Jackie Jackson, 79, American basketball player (Harlem Globetrotters).
Ajmal Khan, Pakistani botanist.
MacArthur Lane, 77, American football player (St. Louis Cardinals, Green Bay Packers, Kansas City Chiefs).
Prospero Nograles, 71, Filipino politician, member (2001–2010) and Speaker of the House of Representatives (2008–2010).
Ray Peters, 72, American baseball player (Milwaukee Brewers).
Ruth Anna Putnam, 91, American philosopher.
Adam Sky, 42, Australian DJ, severed artery from broken glass.
Tommy Sopwith, 86, British racing driver.
Tyrone Thompson, 51, American politician, member of the Nevada Assembly (since 2013).
Yang Shengnan, 81, Chinese historian and palaeographer.

5
Frank Brilando, 93, American Olympic racing cyclist.
Paco Cabasés, 102, Argentine footballer (Talleres de Córdoba), pneumonia.
Feng Shunhua, 85, Chinese economist.
Lewis A. Fidler, 62, American politician, member of the New York City Council (2002–2013).
Eugene McGee, 78, Irish Gaelic football manager (Offaly, Cavan).
Norma Miller, 99, American lindy hop dancer, heart failure.
Kadir Mısıroğlu, 86, Turkish writer.
Celil Oker, 67, Turkish author.
Barbara Perry, 97, American actress (The Andy Griffith Show, The Dick Van Dyke Show, The Hathaways).
Magaly Quintana, 66, Nicaraguan historian and women's rights activist, stroke.
Shih Chi-yang, 84, Taiwanese politician, Minister of Justice (1984–1988), Vice Premier (1988–1993) and President of the Judicial Yuan (1994–1999), multiple organ failure.
Hani Shukrallah, 69, Egyptian journalist (Al-Ahram).

6
Anuar Abu Bakar, 48, Malaysian football player (Selangor, national team) and manager (PKNS), liver cancer.
Pekka Airaksinen, 73, Finnish composer and musician.
Max Azria, 70, Tunisian fashion designer.
Jürgen Bräuninger, 62, South African composer, cancer.
Granville C. Coggs, 93, American doctor and pilot (Tuskegee Airmen).
Jack Cohen, 85, British scientist and author.
Dan Cordtz, 92, American business correspondent (ABC News, Financial World), cancer.
Gjermund Eggen, 77, Norwegian Olympic cross-country skier, world champion (1966).
Peter Gammond, 93, British music critic and journalist.
Andrés Junquera, 73, Spanish footballer (Real Madrid, Real Zaragoza), heart attack.
John Lukacs, 95, Hungarian-born American historian.
Seymour Nurse, 85, Barbadian cricketer (West Indies cricket team).
Pierre Riché, 97, French historian.
Jimmy Satterfield, 79, American football coach (Furman University).
Ted Witherden, 97, English cricketer.
George O. Zimmerman, 85, Polish-born American physicist.

7
A B M Taleb Ali, 92, Bangladeshi teacher and politician.
Urs Amann, 67, Swiss painter.
Ralph Benjamin, 96, British engineer and inventor.
Charles Clarke, 95, British Royal Air Force officer.
Seamus Close, 71, Northern Irish politician, MLA (1998–2007), liver cancer.
Rafael Coronel, 87, Mexican painter.
Karina Constantino David, 73, Filipino political activist and public servant.
Vicente Emano, 76, Filipino politician, Governor of Misamis Oriental (1988–1998) and Mayor of Cagayan de Oro (1998–2007, 2010–2013), pneumonia.
Bernt Frilén, 73, Swedish orienteer, world champion (1972, 1974).
Pedro Gamarro, 64, Venezuelan boxer, silver medalist at the 1976 Summer Olympics.
Larry Hanley, 62, American union leader, international president of the Amalgamated Transit Union (since 2010), pulmonary disease.
Georg Katzer, 84, German composer.
Te Wharehuia Milroy, 81, New Zealand Māori language academic.
Prasert na Nagara, 100, Thai scholar.
Subir Nandi, 66, Bangladeshi musician and playback singer (Shuvoda, Megher Pore Megh), multiple organ failure.
Robert Pear, 69, American journalist (The New York Times), stroke.
Roberta L. Raymond, 80, American actress and open housing activist, heart failure.
Adam Svoboda, 41, Czech ice hockey player (Nürnberg Ice Tigers, national team), suicide by hanging.
Jacques Taminiaux, 90, Belgian philosopher.
Arnaldo Taurisano, 85, Italian basketball coach (Cantù, Partenope Napoli, Brescia).
Jean Vanier, 90, Canadian philosopher, theologian and humanitarian, founder of L'Arche, thyroid cancer.
Joel Virador, 52, Filipino politician, member of the House of Representatives (2003–2007), thyroid cancer.
Michael Wessing, 66, German Olympic javelin thrower, European champion (1978), complications from surgery.

8
Martin Belinga Eboutou, 79, Cameroonian political figure and diplomat.
Jens Beutel, 72, German politician, Lord Mayor of Mainz (1997–2011).
Sprent Dabwido, 46, Nauruan politician, President (2011–2013), throat cancer.
Ketaki Prasad Dutta, 74, Indian politician, MLA (1983–1985).
Jim Fowler, 89, American zoologist and television host (Wild Kingdom).
Richard Hidalgo, 52, Peruvian mountain climber.
Antoine Koné, 56, Ivorian Roman Catholic prelate, Bishop of Odienné (since 2009).
Yevgeny Krylatov, 85, Russian film composer (Film, Film, Film), pneumonia.
Edgardo Maranan, 72, Filipino writer.
Robert McEliece, 76, American mathematician and engineering professor.
N. R. Madhava Menon, 84, Indian legal educator, liver cancer.
David Montgomery, 72, American baseball executive (Philadelphia Phillies), cancer.
Wendell Nedderman, 97, American academic administrator, President of the University of Texas at Arlington (1972–1992).
Georges Pouliot, 96, Canadian Olympic fencer (1948).
Judith S. Stern, 76, American nutritionist.

9
Abul Khayr Alonto, 73, Filipino politician, lawyer and businessman, chairman of the Mindanao Development Authority (since 2016), pneumonia.
David Arias Pérez, 89, Spanish-born American Roman Catholic prelate, Auxiliary Bishop of Newark (1983–2004).
Daniel H. Bays, 77, American historian, Parkinson's disease.
Vasili Blagov, 64, Russian Olympic pair skater (1972), Soviet champion (1972).
Martin Canin, 89, American pianist.
Sergey Dorenko, 59, Russian journalist and news presenter (Vremya), aortic rupture.
Dave Edstrom, 80, American decathlete, Pan American champion (1959).
Preston Epps, 88, American musician.
Clement von Franckenstein, 74, American actor (Lionheart, The American President, Death Becomes Her), hypoxia.
Manuel Giner Miralles, 92, Spanish politician, Deputy (1982–1983).
Walter Harris, 93, British author.
Jim Hawkes, 84, Canadian politician, MP (1979–1993), dementia.
Nelly Korniyenko, 80, Russian actress.
Arif Malikov, 85, Azerbaijani composer, People's Artist of the USSR (1986).
Annemarie Pawlik, 80, Austrian politician, Senator (1990).
Allene Roberts, 90, American actress (The Red House, Knock on Any Door).
Mark Rubinstein, 74, American financial engineer.
Alvin Sargent, 92, American screenwriter (Julia, Ordinary People, Spider-Man 2), Oscar winner (1978, 1981).
B. Mitchell Simpson, 87, American lawyer and naval historian.
Freddie Starr, 76, English comedian, heart disease.
Micky Steele-Bodger, 93, English rugby union player (Harlequins, Barbarians, national team).
Dan van der Vat, 79, Dutch-born British journalist and naval historian.
Brian Walden, 86, British broadcaster (Weekend World) and politician, MP (1964–1977), emphysema.
Yuan Baohua, 103, Chinese politician and academic administrator, Director of the State Economic Commission (1981–1982), President of Renmin University (1985–1991).
Zhan Wenshan, 78, Chinese physicist, founding director of the Technical Institute of Physics and Chemistry, Chinese Academy of Sciences.

10
Carey Adamson, 76, New Zealand air force officer, Chief of Defence Force (1999–2001).
Atanasio Ballesteros, 56, Spanish lawyer and politician, Deputy (1993–2000) and Senator (2000–2004).
Fleming Begaye Sr., 97, American WWII Navajo code talker.
Malcolm Black, 58, New Zealand musician (Netherworld Dancing Toys), bowel cancer.
Frederick Brownell, 79, South African vexillographer, designer of the South African and Namibian flag.
Bert Cooper, 53, American boxer, pancreatic cancer.
Wiley Young Daniel, 72, American senior judge, United States District Court for the District of Colorado (since 1995).
Jon Gittens, 55, English footballer (Swindon Town, Portsmouth, Exeter City).
Anatol Herzfeld, 88, German sculptor and artist.
Richard L. Hills, 82, British historian.
Janet Kitz, 89, Scottish-born Canadian historian and author (Shattered City: The Halifax Explosion and the Road to Recovery).
Jorge Longarón, 86, Spanish comics artist and illustrator (Friday Foster).
John MacInnes, 89, Scottish Gaelic scholar.
Thoppil Mohamed Meeran, 74, Indian Tamil writer.
Gordon Neate, 78, English footballer (Reading).
Domenico Padovano, 78, Italian Roman Catholic prelate, Bishop of Conversano-Monopoli (1987–2016).
Alfredo Pérez Rubalcaba, 67, Spanish politician, Deputy Prime Minister (2010–2011), Minister of the Interior (2006–2011) and Secretary General of the PSOE (2012–2014), stroke.
Warren H. Phillips, 92, American journalist (The Wall Street Journal) and executive (Dow Jones & Company).
M. Ramanathan, 84, Indian politician, MLA (1984–1991).
Geneviève Raugel, 68, French mathematician.
Paul-Werner Scheele, 91, German Roman Catholic prelate, Bishop of Würzburg (1979–2003).
Dick Tomey, 80, American football coach (Hawaii Rainbow Warriors, Arizona Wildcats), lung cancer.
James Tuck, 79, American archaeologist.

11
Jean-Claude Brisseau, 74, French film director (Céline, Secret Things, Les Anges Exterminateurs).
Hector Busby, 86, New Zealand Māori navigator and traditional waka builder.
Sheikh Chand Mohammad, 88, Indian politician, speaker of Assam Legislative Assembly (1979–1986), deputy speaker of Assam Legislative Assembly (1968–1979), MLA (1978–1985).
Gunther Cunningham, 72, German-born American football coach (Kansas City Chiefs, San Diego Chargers, Detroit Lions), cancer.
Gianni De Michelis, 78, Italian politician, Minister of Foreign Affairs (1989–1992), Deputy Prime Minister (1988–1989) and Deputy (1976–1994).
Yogesh Chander Deveshwar, 72, Indian businessman, Chairman and CEO of ITC Limited (1996–2017), cancer.
Melissa Ede, 58, English transgender rights campaigner and social media personality, heart attack.
AKM Gouach Uddin, 69, Bangladeshi politician, MP (1988–1990).
Larry Howard, 73, American baseball player (Houston Astros, Atlanta Braves).
Harold Lederman, 79, American boxing judge and analyst (HBO World Championship Boxing), cancer.
Peggy Lipton, 72, American actress (The Mod Squad, Twin Peaks, The Postman) and model, Golden Globe winner (1970), colon cancer.
Dan Lodboa, 72, Canadian ice hockey player (Chicago Cougars).
Pua Magasiva, 38, Samoan-born New Zealand actor (Shortland Street, Power Rangers Ninja Storm, 30 Days of Night).
Josef Matoušek, 90, Czech Olympic hammer thrower (1964).
Robert D. Maxwell, 98, American combat soldier, recipient of the Medal of Honor.
Hans Muchitsch, 86, Austrian Olympic athlete (1960).
Marcelo Muniagurria, 72, Argentine trade unionist, engineer and agronomist, President of INTA, Vice Governor of Santa Fe Province (1999–2003) and Deputy (1991–1995).
Rong Baisheng, 88, Chinese architect and civil engineer (Guangdong International Building).
Benoît Serré, 68, Canadian politician, cancer.
Silver King, 51, Mexican professional wrestler (CMLL, WCW) and actor (Nacho Libre), heart attack.
Thomas Silverstein, 67, American convicted murderer, Aryan Nations leader, complications from heart surgery.
Eddie Ugbomah, 78, Nigerian film director, producer and actor.
Nan Winton, 93, British broadcaster, first female BBC newsreader, fall.
Sol Yaged, 96, American jazz clarinetist.

12
Mads H. Andenæs, 79, Norwegian legal academic.
Leonard Lee Bailey, 76, American surgeon, throat cancer.
Cosimo Campioto, 84, Italian Olympic rower (1956).
Italo Casali, 78, Sammarinese Olympic sport shooter (1972, 1976).
Eva Dahr, 60, Norwegian filmmaker (Himmelblå, Appelsinpiken, Hotel Cæsar).
Dong Jian, 83, Chinese literary scholar, Vice President of Nanjing University (1988–1993).
Dale Greig, 81, Scottish long-distance runner.
Alan Grover, 74, Australian rowing coxswain, Olympic silver medalist (1968).
Klara Guseva, 82, Russian speed skater, Olympic champion (1960), traffic collision.
Nazir Hoosein, 78, Indian racing driver and motorsport administrator.
Anatoli Ionov, 79, Russian ice hockey player, Olympic champion (1968).
Machiko Kyō, 95, Japanese actress (Rashomon, Ugetsu, The Teahouse of the August Moon), heart failure.
Viktor Manakov, 58, Russian cyclist, Olympic champion (1980), complications from surgery.
Michal Marek, 36, Polish cave diver.
Doug McAvoy, 80, British trade union leader.
Hubert Monteilhet, 90, French author.
Héctor Enrique Olivares, 61, Argentine politician, engineer and agricultural producer, Deputy (since 2015), shot.
B. Venkatarama Reddy, 75, Indian film producer (Uzhaippali, Bhairava Dweepam, Nammavar).
Gene Romero, 71, American motorcycle racer.
Nasrallah Boutros Sfeir, 98, Lebanese Maronite cardinal, Patriarch of Antioch (1986–2011), chest infection.
Alan Skirton, 80, English footballer (Bath City, Arsenal), Alzheimer's disease.
Ron Smerczak, 69, South African actor (Who Am I?, Dangerous Ground, Shadow).
José Terrón, 79, Spanish actor (For a Few Dollars More, The Good, the Bad and the Ugly, Django).
Bill K. Williams, 75, American politician, mayor of Saxman, Alaska (1976–1983), member of the Alaska House of Representatives (1993–2005).
Bill Workman, 78, American politician, mayor of Greenville, South Carolina (1983–1995).
Hiralal Yadav, 93, Indian folk singer.

13
Unita Blackwell, 86, American politician and civil rights activist, mayor of Mayersville, Mississippi (1976–2001), complications of dementia.
Jerome Callet, 89, American music teacher and instrument designer.
Doris Day, 97, American actress (Pillow Talk, Calamity Jane), singer ("Que Sera, Sera") and animal welfare activist, Golden Globe winner (1958, 1960, 1963, 1989), pneumonia.
Velma Demerson, 98, Canadian human rights activist.
Samuel Eugenio, 60, Peruvian football player (Club Universitario de Deportes) and coach, complications from surgery.
Lajos Faragó, 86, Hungarian footballer (national team), Olympic bronze medallist (1960).
Stanton T. Friedman, 84, American-Canadian nuclear physicist and ufologist.
Dionisio Gallarati, 96, Italian mathematician.
Mari Griffith, 79, Welsh radio presenter and singer, cancer.
Hu Jinqing, 83, Chinese animator and director (The Fight Between the Snipe and the Clam, Calabash Brothers).
Jörg Kastendiek, 54, German politician, member of the Bürgerschaft of Bremen (1991–2005, since 2007), lymphoma.
Lo Tung-bin, 92, Taiwanese biochemist, member of Academia Sinica (since 1986).
Hayat Saif, 76, Bangladeshi poet and literary critic.
Nobuo Sekine, 76, Japanese sculptor.
Kochavi Shemesh, 75, Iraqi-born Israeli lawyer and social activist, leader of the Black Panthers protest movement.
George Smith, 75, Scottish football referee.
Werner Weist, 70, German footballer (Borussia Dortmund, Werder Bremen, Stuttgarter Kickers).

14
Urbano José Allgayer, 95, Brazilian Roman Catholic prelate, Bishop of Passo Fundo (1982–1999).
Lutz Bacher, 75, American artist.
Yuriy Bohutsky, 66, Ukrainian politician, Minister of Culture (1999, 2001–2005, 2006–2007), complications from surgery.
Leopoldo Brizuela, 55, Argentine journalist, translator and poet, winner of Alfaguara Prize (2012) and Konex Award (2014).
Tim Conway, 85, American actor (McHale's Navy, The Carol Burnett Show, SpongeBob SquarePants) and comedian, complications from normal pressure hydrocephalus.
Tommy Donbavand, 53, English children's author and actor (Scream Street), throat and lung cancer.
Grumpy Cat, 7, American internet celebrity cat, complications from urinary tract infection.
Andrei Guzienko, 55, Ukrainian footballer (Alga Frunze, Prykarpattya Ivano-Frankivsk, Bukovyna Chernivtsi), ruptured aneurysm.
Sven Lindqvist, 87, Swedish author.
Liu Housheng, 98, Chinese theatre director, critic, scholar, and playwright, Vice President of the China Theatre Association, co-founded the Plum Blossom Award.
Barbara York Main, 90, Australian arachnologist.
Iris Meléndez, Puerto Rican prosecutor, cancer.
Mike Möllensiep, 43, German footballer (Schalke 04, VfB Lübeck, Dynamo Dresden), cancer.
Ferenc József Nagy, 96, Hungarian politician, Minister of Agriculture (1990–1991).
Étienne Perruchon, 61, French composer.
Robert Bruce Propst, 87, American senior judge, United States District Court for the Northern District of Alabama (since 1980).
Ben Raemers, 28, British skateboarder, suicide.
Leon Rausch, 91, American singer (The Texas Playboys).
Alice Rivlin, 88, American economist, director of the Office of Management and Budget (1994–1996).
Michael Rossmann, 88, German-American physicist and microbiologist.
Remig Stumpf, 53, German Olympic cyclist (1988), suicide.
Daniel Vidart, 98, Uruguayan anthropologist, historian and essayist.
Mike Wilhelm, 77, American musician (The Charlatans, Flamin' Groovies), cancer.

15
Rob Babcock, 66, American basketball executive (Denver Nuggets, Minnesota Timberwolves, Toronto Raptors), pancreatic cancer.
Roger Blackley, 65, New Zealand art historian (Victoria University of Wellington).
Huelyn Duvall, 79, American rockabilly musician.
Georgie Anne Geyer, 84, American syndicated newspaper columnist.
Edgar Gorgas, 91, German Olympic boxer (1952).
Ikuo Kamei, 85, Japanese politician, member of the House of Councillors, respiratory failure.
George L. Kelling, 83, American criminologist and professor (Harvard University, Rutgers University–Newark, Manhattan Institute for Policy Research), cancer.
Charles Kittel, 102, American physicist.
Frank F. Ledford Jr., 85, American military doctor, Surgeon General of the United States Army (1988–1992).
Daisy Riley Lloyd, 95, American politician, member of the Indiana House of Representatives (1964–1966).
Juan Antonio Menéndez Fernández, 62, Spanish Roman Catholic prelate, Bishop of Astorga (since 2015), heart attack.
Gabriel Mmole, 80, Tanzanian Roman Catholic prelate, Bishop of Mtwara (1988–2015).
Richard Moore, 88, British journalist and politician.
Kenneth Newing, 95, British Anglican prelate, Bishop of Plymouth (1982–1988).
Neerav Patel, 68, Indian poet, cancer.
Eduardo A. Roca, 97, Argentine diplomat, Ambassador to the United States (1968–1970).
John Ronane, 85, British actor (Strangers).
Rod Tam, 65, American politician, member of the Hawaii House of Representatives (1982–1994) and Senate (1994–2002), complications from leukemia.
Michael Zampelas, 82, Cypriot politician, mayor of Nicosia (2002–2006).

16
Nikolai Baturin, 82, Estonian novelist and playwright.
Piet Blauw, 81, Dutch politician, member of the House of Representatives (1981–1998).
David Cervinski, 48, Australian soccer player (Melbourne Knights, Carlton, Wollongong Wolves), melanoma.
Steve Duemig, 64, American golfer and sports media personality (WDAE, WFNS, Tampa Bay Lightning), complications from brain cancer.
Jean-Pierre Grafé, 87, Belgian politician.
Bob Hawke, 89, Australian politician, Prime Minister (1983–1991), President of the ACTU (1969–1980).
Jonas af Jochnick, 81, Swedish businessman, co-founder of Oriflame.
G. N. Lakshmipathy, 104, Indian film producer (Devara Makkalu, Kaadu, Ondanondu Kaladalli).
Liu Xianjue, 87, Chinese architectural historian.
André Lurton, 94, French winemaker (Château Couhins-Lurton, Château La Louvière, Château Dauzac).
Tohir Malik, 72, Uzbek writer.
Emmanuel Mapunda, 83, Tanzanian Roman Catholic prelate, Bishop of Mbinga (1986–2011).
Peer Mascini, 78, Dutch actor.
Ashley Massaro, 39, American professional wrestler (WWE), model (Playboy) and reality show contestant (Survivor), suicide by hanging.
Mick Micheyl, 97, French actress, singer and sculptor.
Jamil Naqsh, 79, Pakistani painter, pneumonia.
Tommy O'Connell, 79, English hurler (Kilkenny GAA).
Walter Olmo, 80, Italian composer.
I. M. Pei, 102, Chinese-born American architect (Bank of China Tower, East Building of the National Gallery of Art, Louvre Pyramid), Pritzker Prize winner (1983).
Jennifer Price, 79, British archaeologist.
Bob Schloredt, 79, American football player (Washington Huskies, BC Lions) and coach.
Dexter St. Louis, 51, Trinidadian Olympic table tennis player (1996, 2008).
Geoff Toseland, 87, English footballer (Sunderland).
Steve Young, 69, American politician.

17
Paulius Antanas Baltakis, 94, Lithuanian Roman Catholic prelate, Apostolic Visitor for the Lithuanians in Diaspora (1984–2003).
Giancarlo Bassi, 93, Italian Olympic ice hockey player.
Osvaldo Batocletti, 69, Argentine football player and manager (Tigres UANL), cancer.
Barbara Cranmer, 59, Canadian ʼNamgis documentary filmmaker, brain cancer.
Peter Dahl, 85, Norwegian-born Swedish painter.
Jan Elvheim, 69, Norwegian politician, MP (1989–1993).
S. M. Mohamed Idris, 92, Malaysian worker and consumer rights activist, heart failure.
Howard Kilroy, 83, Irish businessman (Bank of Ireland, Smurfit Kappa).
Neville Lederle, 80, South African racing driver.
John Warlick McDonald, 97, American diplomat.
Jimmy McLeod, 82, Canadian ice hockey player (St. Louis Blues).
Anton O'Toole, 68, Irish Gaelic footballer (Dublin).
Rallapalli, 73, Indian actor (Bombay, Minsara Kanavu, Anveshana).
Paul William Roberts, 68–69, Canadian writer, brain haemorrhage.
Valentyn Sapronov, 87, Ukrainian football player (Shakhtar, national team) and manager (Lokomotyv Donetsk).
Kadavoor Sivadasan, 87, Indian politician and trade unionist, MLA (1980–1996, since 2001).
Gerardo Traverso, 43, Uruguayan footballer (Durazno, Guaraní, Dundee).
Jean Valentine, 94, British codebreaker.
Herman Wouk, 103, American author (The Caine Mutiny, The Winds of War, War and Remembrance), Pulitzer Prize winner (1952).

18
Mario Baudoin, 76, Bolivian biologist.
Jean Beaudin, 80, Canadian film director (J.A. Martin Photographer, The Alley Cat, The Collector).
Milton Born With A Tooth, 61, Canadian political activist, bowel cancer.
Manfred Burgsmüller, 69, German footballer (Borussia Dortmund, Werder Bremen, West Germany national team).
Austin Eubanks, 37, American motivational speaker, survivor of the Columbine High School massacre, heroin overdose.
Analía Gadé, 87, Argentine actress (Emergency Ward, Yesterday Was Spring, Another's Wife), cancer.
Aleksandr Irkhin, 65, Russian football manager (Tyumen, Kuban, Metallurg Krasnoyarsk), heart attack.
Jürgen Kissner, 76, German cyclist, Olympic silver medalist (1968).
Sir Timothy Kitson, 88, British politician, MP for Richmond, North Yorkshire (1959–1983).
Ney da Matta, 52, Brazilian football manager (Ipatinga, Brasiliense, CRAC), pancreatitis.
John Payne, 86, American football coach (Saskatchewan Roughriders).
Quentin Pongia, 48, New Zealand rugby league player (Canberra Raiders, Sydney Roosters, national team), bowel cancer.
Justin Ponsor, 42, American comic book artist (Avengers, Spider-Man, X-Men), cancer.
Guenther Roth, 88, American sociologist.
Sammy Shore, 92, American comedian and actor, co-founder of The Comedy Store.
Signe Marie Stray Ryssdal, 94, Norwegian lawyer and politician, MP (1965–1973) and County Governor of Aust-Agder (1983–1994).
Geneviève Waïte, 71, South African actress, singer and model.
Doug Wilson, 88, New Zealand rugby union player (Canterbury, Wellington, national team).
Mitch Wilson, 57, Canadian ice hockey player (Pittsburgh Penguins, New Jersey Devils), amyotrophic lateral sclerosis.

19
Carlos Altamirano, 96, Chilean lawyer and politician, MP (1961–1973) and Secretary-General of the Socialist Party (1971–1979).
Leidy Asprilla, 22, Colombian footballer (Orsomarso), traffic collision.
Jan Bagiński, 86, Polish Roman Catholic prelate, Auxiliary Bishop of Opole (1985–2009).
William W. Caldwell, 93, American senior judge, U.S. District Court Judge for the Middle District of Pennsylvania (since 1982).
George Chaump, 83, American football player and coach (IUP Indians, Marshall Thundering Herd, Navy Midshipmen).
Vitaliy Chernobai, 89, Ukrainian Olympic pole vaulter (1956).
Francisco de Ridder, 89, Argentine Olympic alpine skier (1952).
Denis Earp, 88, South African military officer, Chief of the South African Air Force (1984 – 1988).
Nilda Fernández, 61, Spanish-born French chanson singer, heart failure.
Knut Fredriksson, 89, Swedish Olympic javelin thrower (1960).
Maya Ghosh, 70, Bangladeshi actress.
Amédée Grab, 89, Swiss Roman Catholic prelate, Bishop of Lausanne, Geneva and Fribourg (1995–1998) and Chur (1998–2007).
Bert J. Harris Jr., 99, American politician, member of the Florida House of Representatives (1982–1996).
Ingemar Hedberg, 99, Swedish sprint canoeist, world champion (1950), Olympic silver medalist (1952).
David Hunt, 80, English botanist.
Nickey Iyambo, 82, Namibian politician, Vice-President (2015–2018).
Alfred Janson, 82, Norwegian composer and pianist.
Amalie Kass, 91, American historian.
Bogdan Konopka, 65, Polish photographer.
Nativo Lopez, 67, Mexican-American political activist, President of the Mexican American Political Association (2004–2012), bowel cancer.
John Millett, 98, Australian poet.
Vijaya Mulay, 98, Indian film director (Ek Anek Aur Ekta), historian and educationist.
Susan Papa, 64, Filipino swimmer, cervical cancer.
Liudvikas Saulius Razma, 81, Lithuanian politician.
Bengt Rösiö, 92, Swedish diplomat, ambassador to Saudi Arabia (1974–1977), Pakistan (1977–1979), Czechoslovakia (1979–1981), Malaysia (1981–1985), and Zaire (1990–1992).
Julio César Trujillo, 88, Ecuadorian lawyer and politician, member of the National Congress (1979–1984), complications from intracerebral haemorrhage.
Grace Starry West, 72, American classics scholar, translator and academic (University of Dallas, Hillsdale College), lung cancer.
Ronnie Young, 71, American politician, member of the South Carolina House of Representatives (since 2017).

20
Nanni Balestrini, 83, Italian experimental poet (Neoavanguardia).
Adrish Bardhan, 86, Indian science fiction writer.
Dave Bookman, 58, Canadian radio broadcaster (CFNY-FM, CIND-FM).
Hermann Bottenbruch, 90, German computer scientist.
Sandy D'Alemberte, 85, American lawyer and administrator, member of the Florida House of Representatives (1966–1972), President of the ABA (1991–1992) and FSU (1994–2003).
Rex Dunlop, 91, Scottish footballer (Rangers, Workington, Cheltenham Town).
Yasuo Furuhata, 84, Japanese film director (Poppoya), pneumonia.
Andrew Hall, 65, English actor (Butterflies, Casualty, Coronation Street).
Peter Hitchcock, 75, Australian environmentalist.
Derek Holman, 88, British-born Canadian composer and conductor.
Niki Lauda, 70, Austrian racing driver and airline owner, Formula One world champion (1975, 1977, 1984).
Miguel Montes Busto, 79, Spanish football player and manager (Sporting de Gijón).
John Moore, Baron Moore of Lower Marsh, 81, British politician, MP (1974–1992).
Czesław Nawrot, 77, Polish Olympic rower.
Nguyễn Quảng Tuân, 93, Vietnamese writer and poet.
Solomon Ogbeide, Nigerian football manager (Lobi Stars).
Edmund Outslay, 67, American taxation professor.
Remus Opriș, 60, Romanian politician, MP (1992–2000).
Charles C. Pattillo, 94, American Air Force lieutenant general.
Nicholas Peters, 51, English cricketer (Surrey County Cricket Club), cancer.
Ronnie Virgets, 77, American writer (The Times-Picayune, Gambit) and reporter (WWL-TV).
Mira Zakai, 76, Israeli opera singer, complications from a stroke.

21
Tirong Aboh, 41, Indian politician, MLA (since 2014), shot.
James O. Bass, 108, American lawyer and politician, member of the Tennessee Senate (1936–1938).
Kenelm Burridge, 96, Maltese-born American anthropologist.
Lawrence Carroll, 64, Australian-born American painter.
Densey Clyne, 96, Australian naturalist and author.
Dennis Farnon, 95, Canadian composer.
Fred Fox, 104, American French horn player and brass instrument teacher.
Ernest Graves Jr., 94, American Army lieutenant general.
Brian Kann, 85, Australian football player (Hawthorn).
Rik Kuypers, 94, Belgian film director (Seagulls Die in the Harbour).
Michael Lynch, 84, Irish politician, TD (1982, 1987–1989), Senator (1983–1987).
Ali Mohammad Mahar, 52, Pakistani politician, Minister of Narcotics Control (since 2018) and MP (since 2008), heart attack.
Royce Mills, 77, British actor (History of the World, Part I, Up the Chastity Belt, Doctor Who).
Yavuz Özkan, 76–77, Turkish film director (The Mine).
Aase Texmon Rygh, 94, Norwegian sculptor.
Glauco Sansovini, 81, Sammarinese politician, Captain Regent (2010).
Peter Schulze, 83, Australian politician, member of the Tasmanian Legislative Council (1988–1999).
Bohumil Staša, 75, Czech motorcycle road racer.
Rosław Szaybo, 85, Polish painter, photographer and album cover designer, lung cancer.
Donald West VanArtsdalen, 99, American senior judge, U.S. District Court Judge for the Eastern District of Pennsylvania (since 1970), leukemia.
Freddie Velázquez, 81, Dominican baseball player (Seattle Pilots, Atlanta Braves).
Binyavanga Wainaina, 48, Kenyan writer and journalist, stroke.
Hisae Yanase, 75, Japanese artist.
John A. Yngve, 94, American lawyer and politician, member of the Minnesota House of Representatives (1963–1968).

22
Ahmad Shah of Pahang, 88, Malaysian royal, Sultan of Pahang (1974–2019) and Yang di-Pertuan Agong (1979–1984).
Maurice Bamford, 83, English rugby league player and coach (Wigan Warriors, Leeds Rhinos, Great Britain).
Theresa Burroughs, 89, American civil rights activist.
Tony Gennari, 76, Italian-American basketball player (Varese, Milano 1958, Venezia Mestre).
Joar Hoff, 80, Norwegian football player and manager (Lillestrøm).
Khalid Hossain, 83, Bangladeshi Nazrul Geeti singer.
Flaminia Jandolo, 89, Italian actress and voice actress.
Kwame Kenyatta, 63, American politician, Detroit City Councilman (2006–2013).
Judith Kerr, 95, German-born British writer and illustrator (The Tiger Who Came to Tea, Mog).
Alfred Kröner, 79, German geologist.
Beverly Lunsford, 74, American actress (Leave It to Beaver, The Intruder, The Crawling Hand).
S I M Nurunnabi Khan, 77, Bangladeshi freedom fighter and writer.
Surya Prakash, 79, Indian artist.
Eduard Punset, 82, Spanish economic journalist (BBC, The Economist), science popularizer and politician, Deputy (1982–1983) and MEP (1987–1994), lung cancer.
François-René Tranchefort, 86, French musicologist.

23
Zakir Rashid Bhat, 24, Indian militant, founder of Ansar Ghazwat-ul-Hind, shot.
Joseph Cottet, 96, Swiss politician, member of the Grand Council of Fribourg (1957–1971) and the National Council (1983–1987).
Dumiso Dabengwa, 79, Zimbabwean politician, Minister of Home Affairs (1992–2000), President of the Zimbabwe African People's Union (since 2008), liver disease.
Kalpana Dash, 52, Indian mountaineer.
Joseph Devine, 81, Scottish Roman Catholic prelate, Bishop of Motherwell (1983–2013).
Bill Dickie, 93, Canadian politician, member of the Legislative Assembly of Alberta (1963–1975).
Bondan Gunawan, 71, Indonesian politician, Minister of State secretariat (2000).
Shirley Brannock Jones, 93, American district court judge.
Mike Laffin, 101, Canadian politician, MLA for Cape Breton Centre (1963–1974, 1981–1988).
Peter Landau, 84, German jurist and legal historian.
Bobby Joe Long, 65, American convicted serial killer and rapist, execution by lethal injection.
Hosei Norota, 89, Japanese politician, Director-General of the Defense Agency (1998–1999) and Minister of Agriculture, Forestry and Fisheries (1995–1996), bladder cancer.
Wilfredo Peláez, 88, Uruguayan Olympic basketball player (1952).
Ping Hsin-tao, 92, Taiwanese publisher and producer.
Marie-Madeleine Prongué, 79, Swiss politician, Senator (1995).
Zlatko Škorić, 77, Croatian footballer (Dinamo Zagreb, Stuttgart, Yugoslavia national team).
Beaton Tulk, 75, Canadian politician, Premier of Newfoundland and Labrador (2000–2001) and MHA (1979–1989, 1993–2002), prostate cancer.
Anna Udvardy, 69, Hungarian film producer (Sing), Oscar winner (2017).
Wim Woudsma, 61, Dutch footballer (Go Ahead Eagles).
Zhang Shiping, 72, Chinese businessman, chairman of China Hongqiao Group.

24
Horst H. Baumann, 84, German architect and light artist.
Curtis Blake, 102, American businessman and philanthropist, co-founder of Friendly's.
Gianfranco Bozzao, 82, Italian footballer (Arezzo, SPAL, Juventus).
Hugolino Cerasuolo Stacey, 87, Ecuadorian Roman Catholic prelate, Bishop of Loja (1985–2007).
Bertrand P. Collomb, 76, French business executive.
Jaroslav Erik Frič, 69, Czech poet, musician and publisher, cancer.
Murray Gell-Mann, 89, American physicist, Nobel Prize laureate (1969).
Oleg Golovanov, 84, Russian rower, Olympic champion (1960).
Sharon McAuslan, 74–75, New Zealand jurist, District Court judge (1995–2015).
Edmund Morris, 78, Kenyan-born British-American writer and biographer (The Rise of Theodore Roosevelt, Dutch: A Memoir of Ronald Reagan), Pulitzer Prize winner (1980), stroke.
Alan Murray, 78, Australian golfer, skin cancer.
Ronald E. Nehring, 71, American judge, Justice of the Utah Supreme Court (2003–2015), complications of radiation treatments for cancer.
Manuel Pazos, 89, Spanish footballer (Real Madrid, Atlético Madrid, Elche).
John Pinto, 94, American Navajo code talker and politician, member of the New Mexico Senate (since 1977).
Dušica Žegarac, 75, Serbian actress (The Ninth Circle).

25
Margaret-Ann Armour, 79, Scottish-born Canadian chemist.
Paolo Babbini, 83, Italian politician, Deputy (1979–1983, 1987–1994).
Rod Bramblett, 53, American sportscaster (Auburn Tigers), traffic collision.
Claus von Bülow, 92, Danish-British socialite. 
Jean Burns, 99, Australian aviatrix.
Joseph Anthony Galante, 80, American Roman Catholic prelate, Bishop of Camden (2004–2013).
Rene Goulet, 86, Canadian professional wrestler (AWA, WWF).
Anthony Graziano, 78, American consigliere (Bonanno crime family).
Robert Hecht-Nielsen, 71, American computer scientist. 
Dmytro Kremin, 65, Ukrainian poet, journalist and translator.
Ibrahim Lame, 66, Nigerian educator and politician, Senator (1992–1993) and Minister of Police Affairs (2008–2010).
LaSalle D. Leffall Jr., 89, American surgeon and oncologist.
Karel Masopust, 76, Czech ice hockey player, Olympic silver medalist (1968).
Thembinkosi Mbamba, 23, South African footballer (TS Galaxy), traffic collision.
Seamus McGrane, 64, Irish dissident republican, convicted of terrorism as leader of the Real Irish Republican Army, heart attack.
Mou Tun-fei, 78, Chinese film director (A Deadly Secret, Men Behind the Sun, Black Sun: The Nanking Massacre).
Fredrick Oduya Oprong, 83, Kenyan politician.
Nicolae Pescaru, 76, Romanian footballer (Brașov, national team).
Vittorio Zucconi, 74, Italian-American journalist and writer (la Repubblica).

26
Abdel Latif El Zein, 86, Lebanese politician, MP (1960–2018).
Leann Birch, 72, American developmental psychologist and academic.
Percy Erceg, 90, New Zealand rugby union player (North Auckland, Auckland, national team), Tom French Cup winner (1951).
Harry Hood, 74, Scottish football player (Celtic) and manager (Queen of the South), cancer.
Everett Kinstler, 92, American painter.
Eşref Kolçak, 92, Turkish actor (Namus Uğruna, Berlin in Berlin, Güle Güle).
Richard Paul Matsch, 88, American senior judge, Chief Judge of the District Court for the District of Colorado (1994–2000).
George Park, 86, Canadian Olympic swimmer.
Rafael Safarov, 71, Russian football player and manager (Anzhi Makhachkala).
Edmund Seger, 82, German Olympic wrestler.
Norbert Schedler, 86, American professor of philosophy.
Bart Starr, 85, American Hall of Fame football player (Green Bay Packers) and coach, Super Bowl MVP (1967, 1968), complications from a stroke.
Stephen Thorne, 84, British actor (Z-Cars, Crossroads, Doctor Who).
Prem Tinsulanonda, 98, Thai military officer and politician, Prime Minister (1980–1988), Regent (2016), heart failure.
Kath Venn, 92, Australian politician, member of the Tasmanian Legislative Council for Hobart (1976–1982).

27
Kevin Joseph Aje, 85, Nigerian Roman Catholic prelate, Bishop of Sokoto (1984–2011).
Kamlesh Balmiki, 51, Indian politician, MP (2009–2014).
Robert L. Bernstein, 96, American publisher (Random House) and human rights activist (Helsinki Watch).
Jocelyne Blouin, 68, Canadian meteorologist and weather presenter, cancer.
Bill Buckner, 69, American baseball player (Los Angeles Dodgers, Chicago Cubs, Boston Red Sox), Lewy body dementia.
Petru Cărare, 84, Moldovan writer.
Veeru Devgan, 77, Indian film choreographer (Inkaar), actor (Kranti) and director (Hindustan Ki Kasam), cardiac arrest.
Gabriel Diniz, 28, Brazilian singer and composer, plane crash.
John Ellis, 88, British politician, MP for Bristol North West (1966–1970) and Brigg and Scunthorpe (1974–1979).
Karin Hafstad, 82, Norwegian politician, MP (1973–1981).
Laurie Hendren, 60, Canadian computer scientist, cancer.
Gamini Hettiarachchi, 68, Sri Lankan actor, (Sidu), complications from a kidney transplant.
Roger O. Hirson, 93, American dramatist and screenwriter (Pippin, Walking Happy).
Tony Horwitz, 60, American journalist (The Wall Street Journal) and author (Confederates in the Attic, Blue Latitudes), Pulitzer Prize winner (1995).
Guy Jansen, 84, New Zealand choral director.
James S. Ketchum, 87, American psychiatrist and US army colonel.
Jimilu Mason, 88–89, American sculptor.
Les McFarlane, 66, Jamaican-born English cricketer (Lancashire).
Judith McKenzie, 61, Australian archaeologist.
Kelly Paris, 61, American baseball player (Cincinnati Reds, Chicago White Sox).
Hariom Singh Rathore, 61, Indian politician, MP (since 2014), cancer.
Aharon Razin, 84, Israeli biochemist.
Colin Ross, 85, English bagpipe maker.
Sir David Sieff, 80, British businessman (Marks & Spencer).
Alan Smith, 97, English footballer (Arsenal, Brentford).
Moni Kumar Subba, 61, Indian politician, MP (1998–2009), heart failure.
François Weyergans, 77, Belgian novelist and film director (Flesh Color).

28
Horace Belton, 63, American football player (Montreal Alouettes, Kansas City Chiefs).
Freddy Buache, 94, Swiss journalist, film critic and historian.
Fabio Calzavara, 68, Italian politician, Deputy (1996–2001), heart attack.
Carmine Caridi, 85, American actor (The Godfather Part II, Bugsy, Summer Rental), pneumonia.
Dan Crane, 83, American politician, member of the U.S. House of Representatives (1979–1985).
Jean Juventin, 91, French politician, Deputy (1978–1986, 1993–1997), President of the Assembly of French Polynesia (1988–1991, 1992–1995) and Mayor of Papeete (1977–1995).
Khoo Kay Kim, 82, Malaysian historian, respiratory failure.
Li Hengde, 97, Chinese materials scientist, academician of the Academy of Engineering.
John Paul Meagher, 80, Canadian politician.
Ralph Murphy, 75, British-born Canadian country musician, pneumonia.
Apolo Nsibambi, 78, Ugandan academic and politician, Prime Minister (1999–2011), cancer.
Levi Oakes, 94, Canadian-born American soldier, last living WWII Mohawk code talker.
Włodzimierz Ptak, 90, Polish immunologist and microbiologist.
Fritz Schösser, 71, German politician, member of the Bavarian Senate (1992–1994), Landtag of Bavaria (1994–1998) and Bundestag (1998–2005).
Edward Seaga, 89, Jamaican politician, Prime Minister (1980–1989), cancer.
Petr Sgall, 93, Czech linguist.
Ingemar Skogö, 70, Swedish civil servant, Governor of Västmanland County (2009–2015), Director-General of the LFV (1992–2001) and the SRA (2001–2009).
Nick Stato, 97, American boxer.
Tuulikki Ukkola, 75, Finnish journalist (Kaleva) and politician, MP (1991–1995, 2007–2011) and leader of the Liberal People's Party (1993–1995).
Thomas Wainwright, 78, English cricketer.
Walter Wolfgang, 95, German-born British socialist and peace activist.
Nick Yakich, 79, Australian rugby league player (Manly Warringah Sea Eagles).

29
Jack Burton, 99, American Olympic equestrian (1956).
Errett Callahan, 81, American archaeologist.
Tony DeLap, 91, American artist.
Dennis Etchison, 76, American author and editor.
Michel Gaudry, 90, French jazz bassist.
Tony Glover, 79, American blues harmonicist (Koerner, Ray & Glover).
Muhammad Tholchah Hasan, 80, Indonesian Islamic cleric, academic, and politician, Minister of Religious Affairs (1999–2001), stomach cancer.
Roy Jeffs, 26, American sexual abuse victim, suicide.
Loren E. Monroe, 87, American politician, Michigan state treasuer (1978–1982).
Adam Patel, Baron Patel of Blackburn, 78, British clothier and Member of the House of Lords (since 2000).
Bayram Şit, 89, Turkish wrestler, Olympic champion (1952).
Michael Spicer, 76, British politician, MP (1974–2010), chairman of the 1922 Committee (2001–2010) and Member of the House of Lords (since 2010), Parkinson's disease and leukaemia.
Peggy Stewart, 95, American actress (The Fighting Redhead, The Life and Legend of Wyatt Earp, That's My Boy).
Jiří Stránský, 87, Czech author, translator and political prisoner.
Jackie Winters, 82, American politician, member of the Oregon House of Representatives (1999–2003) and Senate (since 2003), lung cancer.
Igor Zavozin, 63, Russian ice dancer.

30
Mike Balson, 71, English footballer (Exeter City and Highlands Park) and referee, complications from Lewy Body Dementia.
Patricia Bath, 76, American ophthalmologist, cancer.
Paulo de Mello Bastos, 101, Brazilian pilot.
Milan Blažeković, 78, Croatian animator (The Elm-Chanted Forest, The Magician's Hat, Lapitch the Little Shoemaker).
Michel Canac, 62, French Olympic alpine skier (1984), skiing accident.
Innocenzo Chatrian, 92, Italian Olympic cross-country skier (1956).
Thad Cochran, 81, American politician, member of the U.S. Senate (1978–2018) and the House of Representatives (1973–1978), renal failure.
Allan Edwards, 97, Australian cricketer (Western Australia).
André Gerolymatos, 67, Greek-Canadian historian and professor, brain cancer.
Eva Kleinitz, 47, German opera director.
Johnny Kleinveldt, 61, South African cricketer (Western Province, Transvaal).
Frank Lucas, 88, American drug trafficker, depicted in American Gangster.
Arne Lyngstad, 57, Norwegian politician, MP (1997–2005), cancer. 
Jason Marcano, 35, Trinidadian footballer (San Juan Jabloteh, Central, Trinidad and Tobago national team), traffic collision.
Murray Polner, 91, American editor and author.
Anthony Price, 90, British author.
Leon Redbone, 69, Cypriot-American singer-songwriter and actor (Elf), complications from dementia.
Diogo Reesink, 84, Dutch Roman Catholic prelate, Bishop of Almenara (1989–1998) and Teófilo Otoni (1998–2009).
Giuseppe Sandri, 72, Italian Roman Catholic prelate, Bishop of Witbank (since 2009).
Andrew Sinclair, 84, British novelist and film director (The Breaking of Bumbo, Under Milk Wood, Blue Blood).
John Tidmarsh, 90, English broadcaster and journalist (Outlook).

31
David M. Ainsworth, 64, American politician, member of the Vermont House of Representatives (2007–2011, 2017–2019).
Andaiye, 76, Guyanese political activist, cancer.
Roky Erickson, 71, American singer-songwriter (The 13th Floor Elevators).
Paddy Fahey, 102, Irish composer and fiddler.
Sir Grant Hammond, 75, New Zealand jurist, judge of the Court of Appeal (2004–2011).
Đelo Jusić, 80, Croatian composer and guitarist.
Panayotis Katsoyannis, 95, American biochemist.
Jean-Claude Labrecque, 80, Canadian cinematographer and filmmaker.
Jimmy Martin, 80, American politician, member of the Alabama House of Representatives (1998–2010, since 2014), cancer.
Patrick Matolengwe, 82, South African Anglican bishop.
Jim McMullan, 82, American actor (Dallas, Downhill Racer, Shenandoah), complications from ALS.
Aideen Nicholson, 92, Irish-born Canadian politician.
Laila Nur, 84, Bangladeshi language activist.
Hari Sabarno, 74, Indonesian military officer and politician, Minister of Home Affairs (2001–2004).
Le Anne Schreiber, 73, American sports editor (The New York Times, ESPN), lung cancer.
Niara Sudarkasa, 80, American anthropologist, President of Lincoln University (1987–1998).
Chitra Wakishta, 82, Sri Lankan actress (Kopi Kade).

References

2019-05
 05